Szamoránsky is a Hungarian surname with Slovak origins. Notable people with the surname include:

Anikó Szamoránsky (born 1986), Hungarian handball player
Piroska Szamoránsky (born 1986), Hungarian handball player, twin sister of Anikó

Hungarian-language surnames
Surnames of Slovak origin